"F.E.A.R." is the first single from Ian Brown's third solo album, Music of the Spheres.  Released on 17 September 2001, it placed No. 13 on the UK Singles Chart and was both a commercial and critical success.  In late 2002, it won a Muso Award for best single, as voted by his peers in the British music industry.  In October 2011, NME placed it at number 67 on its list "150 Best Tracks of the Past 15 Years".

Influences

The song incorporates a lyric scheme where each verse forms the acrostic "F.E.A.R."  (for example, "For each a road" and "Fallen empires are ruling").  In an interview with Clash magazine, Brown said that a main influence for "F.E.A.R." was The Autobiography of Malcolm X, which preached the study of etymology, so that one could have "control over people through the use of language."  He then created hundreds of acrostics for the word "fear".

Brown revisited the concept in the title of the Solarized track, "Time Is My Everything", which is often abbreviated by with the acronym "T.I.M.E." on concert setlists.

Remixed and instrumental versions of "F.E.A.R." also appeared in the remix album, Remixes of the Spheres.  A 30-second clip of the instrumental version appears at the end of the LP version of Music of the Spheres; this is a tribute to Marvin Gaye's What's Going On which also featured a clip of the lead track at the end of the album.

Track listing

CD single
"F.E.A.R." (album version)
"F.E.A.R." (with Dann)
"Hear No See No Speak No"
"F.E.A.R." (CD-ROM video)

7" single
"F.E.A.R."
"F.E.A.R. (instrumental)"

12" single
 F.E.A.R. (UNKLE remix)

Release details

Music video
The music video for "F.E.A.R." marked Brown's directorial debut.  It featured footage of the singer slowly riding a bicycle through the busy streets of Soho and Chinatown in London, which was then reversed to give the impression of being ridden backwards. The route followed was from Berwick Street to Gerrard Street.

Certifications

Notes
 Promotional copy with only one song, "F.E.A.R.".

References

  

Songs about language
2001 singles
Ian Brown songs
Songs written by Dave McCracken
2001 songs
Polydor Records singles
Songs written by Ian Brown